The coat of arms of Czechoslovakia were changed many times during Czechoslovakia’s history, some alongside each other. This reflects the turbulent history of the country and a wish to use appropriate territorial coats of arms.

In creation of Czechoslovakia

First (1918–1938), Second (1938–1939) and Post-War Czechoslovak Republic (1945–1960)

Three variants of the coat of arms of Czechoslovakia were adopted in 1920 along with the Czechoslovak Constitution of 1920. After creation of the Second Czechoslovak Republic in 1938 all versions legally remained official, although state power and the government used chiefly the middle version, as to emphasize new autonomous federal regime and abandonment of the concept of Czechoslovakism. Middle arms was effectively put out of use when Germany occupied Bohemia and Moravia and independent Slovakia were established. When Czechoslovakia was re-established in 1945 at the end of the Second World War, all three versions were re-established, but the lesser coat of arms became the primary used version. Middle version were not used afterwards.

The smaller arms was in essence the arms of Bohemia (Čechy) superimposed by the arms of Slovakia (Slovensko). The Slovak arms should not be seen as a Herzschild but as a shield carried by the Bohemian lion in the larger motif. It is thus not to be seen as an inescutcheon taking up the honorary heart position in the arms. As can be seen in the image, it is also not placed in the visual centre of the arms.

The middle arms on the other hand, had one shield in the heart position, the arms of Bohemia. The main shield also held the arms of Slovakia, Carpathian Ruthenia, Moravia, and Silesia.

The greater arms consisted of the same fields as in the middle arms completed with three more arms: the arms of the region of Těšín Silesia and the historical duchies of Opava and Ratibor. The greater arms also had two lions as supporters and national motto. In the region of Slovakia adequate motto changes to Slovak version: Pravda víťazí. in all other regions including Bohemia, Moravia-Silesia and Subcarpathian Rus' Czech version was used.

Occupied Czechoslovakia (1938–1945)

Czechoslovak Socialist Republic (1960–1990)

Czechoslovakia had a Communist regime from 1948, but this initially retained the smaller coat of arms of 1920 and did not adopt an emblem in the form of so-called "socialist heraldry" so popular in most other countries influenced by the Soviet Union. In 1960 however, the arms were redesigned in the form of a pavise, a form of shield seldom used in heraldry, originally intended to stand on the ground and protect foot soldiers rather than the usual knight's shield. This type of shield was associated with the Hussites in Czech history, whose rebellion was interpreted as proto-communist revolutionary movement by the state-sanctioned Marxist historiography. Above the Bohemian lion, the red star of Communism replaced the crown and the arms of Slovakia, still carried by the lion, was totally remade, removing the cross in favour of the fire of partisans and the trimount was replaced with a naturalistic silhouette of the Kriváň mountain.

Czech and Slovak Federative Republic (1990–1992)

Following the fall of Communism in 1989, traditional heraldry was reinstated and new national arms were designed, quartering the arms of Bohemia and Slovakia. These arms were valid until Czechoslovakia was dissolved during the new year period of 1992/93.

Post-Czechoslovak coats of arms

References

 Vexilolognet.cz - History of the symbols of Czechoslovakia
 Vlastenci.cz
  Senate:The Czech national emblem

Czechoslovakia
Czechoslovakia
Government of Czechoslovakia
National symbols of the Czech Republic
National symbols of Slovakia
Czechoslovakia
Czechoslovakia
Czechoslovakia